Jeniffer Valeria Mella Escobar (born 10 January 1980) is a Chilean lawyer who was elected as a member of the Chilean Constitutional Convention.

References

External links
 

Living people
1981 births
Chilean women lawyers
21st-century Chilean politicians
21st-century Chilean women politicians
University of Chile alumni
Members of the Chilean Constitutional Convention
Chilean LGBT politicians
Chilean lesbians
Lesbian politicians
People from Santiago
People from San Fernando, Chile
21st-century Chilean lawyers